The World Group was the highest level of Davis Cup competition in 1982.

The United States were the defending champions, and won the title, defeating France in the final, 4–1. The final was held at the Palais des Sports in Grenoble, France, from 26 to 28 November. It was the US team's second consecutive title and their 28th Davis Cup title overall.

Participating teams

Draw

First round

United States vs. India

Sweden vs. Soviet Union

Mexico vs. Australia

Chile vs. Romania

New Zealand vs. Spain

Italy vs. Great Britain

Czechoslovakia vs. West Germany

Argentina vs. France

Quarterfinals

United States vs. Sweden

Australia vs. Chile

Italy vs. New Zealand

France vs. Czechoslovakia

Semifinals

Australia vs. United States

France vs. New Zealand

Final

France vs. United States

Relegation play-offs
The first-round losers played in the Relegation Play-offs. The winners of the play-offs advanced to the 1983 Davis Cup World Group, and the losers were relegated to their respective Zonal Regions.

Results summary
Date: 1–3 October

Soviet Union vs. India

Mexico vs. Romania

Spain vs. Great Britain

Argentina vs. West Germany

References

External links
Davis Cup official website

World Group
Davis Cup World Group
Davis Cup